Demetrius Latron Taylor (born May 27, 1999) is an American football defensive tackle for the Detroit Lions of the National Football League (NFL). He played college football at Appalachian State.

College career
Taylor played at Appalachian State from 2017–2021. He led the Sun Belt Conference with three forced fumbles in the 2019 season.

Professional career
Taylor signed with the Detroit Lions as an undrafted free agent on April 30, 2022, following the 2022 NFL Draft. He made the Lions' final 53-man roster out of training camp. He was waived on October 27, 2022, and re-signed to the practice squad. He signed a reserve/future contract on January 9, 2023.

References

External links
 Detroit Lions bio
 Appalachian State Mountaineers bio

1999 births
Living people
American football defensive tackles
Sportspeople from Florida
Appalachian State Mountaineers football players
Detroit Lions players
Players of American football from Miami